Bernard Barnjak (born 1 May 1965) is a retired Bosnian footballer who played as a centre forward.

Club career
Born in Sarajevo, Socialist Federal Republic of Yugoslavia, Barnjak played for FK Sarajevo and Hajduk Split in the Yugoslav First League. In 1990, he moved abroad for the first time, joining CD Castellón in La Liga. Unsettled in Spain, he quickly returned to his first professional club.

In the 1991 summer, Barnjak signed for F.C. Famalicão, alongside teammate Dane Kuprešanin. Regularly used during three seasons, he helped the team to consecutive Primeira Liga campaigns.

Barnjak closed out his career at 33, after two years apiece with Greek sides Apollon Smyrnis FC (second division) and Paniliakos FC (Superleague).

References

External links

1965 births
Living people
Footballers from Sarajevo
Association football forwards
Yugoslav footballers
Bosnia and Herzegovina footballers
FK Sarajevo players
HNK Hajduk Split players
CD Castellón footballers
F.C. Famalicão players
Apollon Smyrnis F.C. players
Paniliakos F.C. players
Yugoslav First League players
La Liga players
Primeira Liga players
Super League Greece players
Football League (Greece) players
Yugoslav expatriate footballers
Bosnia and Herzegovina expatriate footballers
Expatriate footballers in Spain
Yugoslav expatriate sportspeople in Spain
Expatriate footballers in Portugal
Bosnia and Herzegovina expatriate sportspeople in Portugal
Expatriate footballers in Greece
Bosnia and Herzegovina expatriate sportspeople in Greece
Bosnia and Herzegovina expatriate sportspeople in Spain